Dongou is a city and seat of Dongou District in the Likouala Region of northeastern Republic of the Congo.

Dongou was the first capital of the region of "Oubangui inférieure" when it was in French Congo. At independence on 1960, it became the economic capital of Likouala region. Now, Dongou's population is over 10,000. Dongou receives two rivers: Oubangui with white water, and Motaba River, with black water.

References

Likouala Department
Populated places in the Republic of the Congo
Ubangi River
Democratic Republic of the Congo–Republic of the Congo border crossings